Levaillant's cisticola (Cisticola tinniens), also known as the tinkling cisticola, is a small passerine bird which is native to marshlands in the uplands of Africa, southwards of the equator.

Description
Levaillant's cisticola is a small, 12–15 cm long, dull-coloured bird with a longish tail and a reddish cap. The upperparts of the breeding adult are grey, heavily streaked with black, and with a rufous panel in the folded wing. The supercilium, face and underparts are buffy white and the tail is russet brown. The short straight bill is blackish-brown with a pinkish base, and the feet and legs are pinkish-brown. The eye is light brown.  Non-breeding adults are browner-backed, and juvenile birds have yellower underparts.  The calls include a musical  , a wailing  and harsh alarm notes.

Distribution and habitat

The cisticola is a resident breeder in eastern Africa from Kenya to eastern South Africa. It is common in reedbeds, sedges, rank grass, and similar wet habitats usually near rivers or dams.

Behaviour
Levaillant's cisticola is usually seen in pairs, singly, or in small family parties. Flitting through the grass as it forages for small insects. It is vocal and conspicuous, perching on the top of tall grass stems and reeds and making its alarm call.

Breeding
The cisticola builds a ball-shaped nest with a side entrance from dry grass, cobwebs and felted plant down. It is usually placed in a tuft of grass or weeds, which are standing in, or hanging over water. Nesting occurs from August to October.

Conservation status
This common species has a large range, with an estimated extent of 1,400,000 km2. The population size is believed to be large, and the species is not believed to approach the thresholds for the population decline criterion of the IUCN Red List (i.e. declining more than 30% in ten years or three generations). For these reasons, the species is evaluated as least concern.

References

Ian Sinclair, Phil Hockey and Warwick Tarboton, SASOL Birds of Southern Africa (Struik 2002) 
SASOL Bird e-Guide

External links
 Levaillant's cisticola - Species text in The Atlas of Southern African Birds.

Levaillant's cisticola
Birds of Sub-Saharan Africa
Birds of Southern Africa
Taxa named by Hinrich Lichtenstein
Levaillant's cisticola